The 1964 Titleholders Championship was the 25th Titleholders Championship, held April 23–26 at Augusta Country Club in Augusta, Georgia. Reigning champion Marilynn Smith  successfully defended her title, one stroke ahead of runner-up Mickey Wright. The two had met in an 18-hole playoff the previous year which was decided on the final green.  Wright had won the title in 1961 and 1962.

It was the second and final major title for Smith. Her second round 66 (−6) on Friday set several records for this championship, including lowest round, lowest score after 36 holes at 139 (−5), 54 holes at 216 (even), and 72 holes at 289 (+1). Her Friday inward nine score of 31 was also a record, by two strokes.

In the third round on Saturday, scores soared in the rain and cold wind. Smith's 77 (+5) kept the lead at an even-par 216 for 54 holes, three shots ahead of Wright.

Final leaderboard
Sunday, April 26, 1964

Source:

References

Titleholders Championship
Golf in Georgia (U.S. state)
Titleholders Championship
Titleholders Championship
Titleholders Championship
Titleholders Championship
Women's sports in Georgia (U.S. state)